The Chiayi County Magistrate is the chief executive of the Chiayi County government in Taiwan. Initially magistrates were appointed by the Taiwan Provincial Government, but from 1951 the role has been directly elected by the population of Chiayi County. The current magistrate is Weng Chang-liang of Democratic Progressive Party since 25 December 2018.

Directly elected magistrates
In the multi-party era (1987 onwards) the post has been held three times by the Kuomintang and six times by the Democratic Progressive Party. Under current rules magistrates serve four-year terms, and can stand for re-election once.

Timeline

References

 
Chiayi County